Mattner is a surname. Notable people with the surname include:

Martin Mattner (born 1982), Australian rules footballer
Ted Mattner (1893–1977), Australian politician